Cenk Güvenç (born December 29, 1991) is a footballer who most recently played for Balıkesirspor. Born in Germany, he represented Turkey at youth international level.

References

External links

 
 
 
 

1991 births
Living people
Turkish footballers
German footballers
Turkey youth international footballers
Gaziantepspor footballers
German people of Turkish descent
People from Seligenstadt
Sportspeople from Darmstadt (region)
Süper Lig players
Segunda División B players
Atlético Madrid B players
Çaykur Rizespor footballers
Karşıyaka S.K. footballers
Denizlispor footballers
TFF First League players
Association football defenders
Footballers from Hesse
Turkish expatriate footballers
German expatriate footballers
German expatriate sportspeople in Spain
Expatriate footballers in Spain
Turkish expatriate sportspeople in Spain